Foreign support in the Bosnian War included the funding, training or military support by foreign states and organizations outside Yugoslavia to any of the belligerents in the Bosnian War (1992–95).

Support to Bosnian Muslims

Iran, a predominantly Shia country, was one of the first Muslim countries to provide support for the Bosnian Muslims (Bosniaks, who are mainly Sunni Muslim) in the war. The Islamic Revolutionary Guard Corps (IRGC) sent more than five (5,000 to 14,000 tons from May 1994 to January 1996 alone) thousand tonnes of arms to the Bosnian Muslims. IRGC also supplied trainers and advisers for the Bosnian military and intelligence service. Several dozen Iranian intelligence experts joined the Bosnian Muslim intelligence agency. The Iranian Ministry of Intelligence-supported mujahideen units trained selected Bosnian army units. The Hezbollah (Lebanese Shia), supported by Iran, also sent fighters to the war.  In 1992, Iran with the help of Turkey smuggled arms to the Bosnian Muslims. Reports of "hundreds of tons of weapons" shipped from Iran over a period of months appeared in the media in early 1995. Iranian arms were shipped through Croatia.  Robert Baer, a CIA agent stationed in Sarajevo during the war, later claimed that "In Sarajevo, the Bosnian Muslim government is a client of the Iranians . . . If it's a choice between the CIA and the Iranians, they'll take the Iranians any day." By the war's end, public opinion polls showed some 86% of the Bosnian Muslim population expressed a positive attitude toward Iran. According to the scholar Cees Wiebes, during the war “Turkey and Saudi Arabia were very willing to deliver weapons and to lure Alija Izetbegović away from Iran, but the orientation of the Bosnian government was far more towards Iran.”
Pakistan's Inter Services Intelligence (ISI) supplied the Bosnian Muslims with arms, ammunition and guided anti-tank missiles. Pakistan defied the UN's ban on supply of arms to the war (declaring it illegal, among other Muslim countries) and ISI airlifted anti-tank guided missiles to the Bosnian Muslims. Pakistan financially aided the Bosnian Muslims.
Saudi Arabia assisted the Bosnian Muslims with funding, arms and volunteer fighters. Military operations were funded and supported by the Saudi High Commission (SHC), founded by Saudi prince Salman bin Abdul-Aziz. Saudi Arabia provided $300 million in arms supplies (and $500 in humanitarian aid) to the Bosnian government, in violation to the embargo and with the knowing of the United States.
Turkey actively supported the Bosnian Muslims. It assisted Iran with smuggling arms to the Bosnian Muslims. The Turkish line included arms and money also from Saudi Arabia, Malaysia, Brunei and Pakistan. Turkish private individuals and groups financially supported the Bosnian Muslims, and some hundreds of Turks joined as volunteers. Greatest private aid came from Islamist groups, such as the Refah Party and IHH. As a NATO member, Turkey supported and participated in NATO operations, including sending 18 F-16 planes. It was the first of the member countries to call for military intervention, and backed all US calls for engagement, and strongly supported air strikes. It has been noted though, that financial aid from the Turkish government was minimal.
Malaysia supported the Bosnian Muslims through financial aid and arms.
Brunei supported the Bosnian Muslims through financial aid and arms. It officially supported the Bosnian Muslims and spoke against the Bosnian Serbs. It was widely reported that Brunei helped in the purchase and delivery of shipments of small arms.
Sudan financially aided the Bosnian Muslims.
The United States took no actions against the smuggling of arms, of which they knew. The CIA funded, trained and supplied the Bosnian Army. EU intelligence sources suggested that the US organized arms shipments to Bosnia through Muslim allies. The private military contractor MPRI, approved by the US government, used money provided by pro-Western Islamic countries such as Saudi Arabia, UAE, Kuwait, Brunei and Malaysia to equip the Bosnian army with 46,000 rifles, 1,000 machine guns, 80 APCs, 45 tanks, 840 anti-tank guns and 15 helicopters. The MPRI received $300 million to equip and $50 million to train the Bosnian army.
NATO, headed by the United States, intervened through air operations.

Among foreign Islamist organizations supporting the Bosnian Muslims were Al-Qaeda (including Bosnian branch), Harkat ul-Ansar, Refah Party, Armed Islamic Group of Algeria, and others. Among foreign non-profit organizations and charitable trusts were the Saudi Benevolence International Foundation (Al-Qaeda) and al-Haramain Foundation (Al-Qaeda-associated), the Turkish IHH, and others. The Third World Relief Agency (TWRA) based in Vienna was the "main financier and mediator" in the arms smuggling. The TWRA received $350 million from deposits by Saudi Arabia, Iran, Sudan, Turkey, Brunei, Malaysia and Pakistan.

Support to Bosnian Croats

Support to Bosnian Serbs
Russia followed Western policy, but had reservations against some policies, such as NATO air strikes, which it believed was beyond UN resolutions. It tried to moderate anti-Serb decisions in discussions with Western powers. A number of Russian politicians showed solidarity with the Serbs. Hundreds of Russians volunteered on the Serb side.
Greece
The Greek Volunteer Guard (Serbian: Грчка Добровољачка Гарда; Greek: Ελληνική Εθελοντική Φρουρά) was a unit of Greek volunteers that fought in the Bosnian War on the side of the Army of the Republika Srpska. Some members of the unit are alleged to have been present in the area of the Srebrenica Massacre and reportedly hoisted a Greek flag over the town, which was videoed ‘for marketing purposes’. Greece didn't participate in NATO strikes on Serb held territory, and there was even minimal financial aid, but not from the Greek government, rather from Greek organisations which saw Serbs as Christian brethren and thus ought to help their war cause.

Foreign fighters
 
Volunteers came to fight for a variety of reasons including religious or ethnic loyalties and in some cases for money. As a general rule, Bosniaks received support from Islamic countries, Serbs from Eastern Orthodox countries, and Croats from Catholic countries.

See also
Sanctions against Yugoslavia
United Nations Protection Force (UNPROFOR), UN peacekeeping
Stabilisation Force in Bosnia and Herzegovina (SFOR), NATO-led peacekeeping

References

Sources

Books
 
 
 
 
 
 

Journals
 Demirtaş-Çoşkun, B., 2011. Turkish foreign policy toward the Bosnian war (1992–1995): A constructive analysis. Karadeniz Araştırmaları Dergisi, 18, pp. 1–18.

News articles
 
 
 
 

Bosnian War
Presidency of Bill Clinton
Foreign relations of Bosnia and Herzegovina